40 ljuva år! is a compilation album from Swedish dansband Lasse Stefanz released on 27 December 2006. The album reached number one on the Swedish album chart.

Track listing
 Ett äventyr
 Hej, fröken Sommar
 Farväl, farväl
 De sista ljuva åren
 Den lilla klockan
 Över bergen skall det klinga
 Orgeln på vinden
 Huset i dalen
 Ye-si-ca
 Marie, Marie
 Lassie
 Quando
 Skattlösa bergen (Wolverton Mountain)
 Det smärtar mitt hjärta
 Årets skiftningar
 Tre unga män (I Wrote a Song)
 Sommarnatt (Blaue Nacht)
 Köp rosor
 Vildandens klagan
 Morgongåva
 Skomakar Anton
 Visa i Citruslunden
 Du försvann som en vind,
 Peppelinos bar
 Världens lyckligaste par
 Främling
 Nere på Söder
 Oh Julie
 Dej ska jag älska
 Katmandu
 En gitarr
 Gammal kärlek rostar aldrig
 Kära Ruth
 Klockorna i gamla stan
 I kväll
 Den sången han sjöng
 Spelmansminnen
 Dandy man
 Rented tuxedo
 What am I Living for
 Traveling Light
 Vid en liten fiskehamn
 Darlin'
 Ett litet munspel
 Have You Ever Been Lonely

Charts

Weekly charts

Year-end charts

Certifications

References 

2006 compilation albums
Lasse Stefanz albums
Compilation albums by Swedish artists